Dyck Advisory Group (or DAG) is a private military company based in Velddrif, South Africa.

History
The firm was founded in 2012 by Lionel Dyck, an ex-military colonel who had served in the Rhodesian Security Forces and then the Zimbabwe Defence Forces. He fought as part of the Zimbabwean intervention force that assisted the Mozambican government against RENAMO during the Mozambican Civil War. At the time, he forged good relations in the Mozambican governing party FRELIMO and with later Zimbabwean President Emmerson Mnangagwa. Following the Mozambican Civil War, Dyck continued to be involved in Mozambique, participating in demining and anti-poaching operations.

The Dyck Advisory Group specializes in demining and anti-poaching services, and has customers around the world. From 2019, the firm became active in Cabo Delgado, Mozambique, where they helped to fight a local Islamist insurgency. The company was hired by police chief Bernardino Rafael, and helped to train local policemen besides fighting the rebels. The Dyck Advisory Group's troops operate and charter out several Bat Hawk light aircraft, and have deployed 3 Aérospatiale Gazelles, 2 Eurocopter AS350 Écureuils, and 1 Aérospatiale Alouette III in Cabo Delgado.

In 2021, Amnesty International reported that during operations in Mozambique, the firm's operatives fired machine guns from helicopters and dropped hand grenades indiscriminately into crowds of people, as well as repeatedly firing at civilian infrastructure, including hospitals, schools, and homes.

In the Battle of Palma of March and April 2021, the company assisted the Mozambican military and police forces in combating the attacking insurgents. According to Dyck, his operatives engaged several of the terrorists as well as rescued wounded policemen and trapped civilians. The rescue conducted in part by the Dyck Advisory Group was accused of rescuing white contractors before local black civilians by Amnesty International.

References

External links 
 Dyck Advisory Group 

2012 establishments in South Africa
Private military contractors
Security companies of South Africa